Bouguenais is a commune in the Loire-Atlantique department in western France near Nantes.

Bouguenais is home to the Nantes Atlantique Airport.

Population

Economy

Régional, a regional airline, was headquartered on the grounds of Nantes Atlantique Airport.

Régional was formed on 30 March 2001 with the merger of Regional Airlines, Flandre Air, and Proteus Airlines. Before the formation of Régional, Regional Airlines had its headquarters on the grounds of the airport. Regional Airlines was the largest of the three companies that were merged into the new Régional. In 2013 the airline merged into HOP!, itself rebranded in 2019 as Air France Hop, which is still based at Nantes Atlantique Airport.

Mayors
List of the mayors of Bouguenais since 1900.
 2020-    : Sandra Impériale
 2014-2020: Martine Le Jeune
 2007-2014: Michèle Gressus
 1993-2007: Françoise Verchère (resigned in September 2007)
 1971-1993: François Autain
 1947-1971: Henri Robichon
 1945-1947: Alexandre Gendron
 1944-1945: Georges Gaborieau
 1941-1944: Élie Leaute
 1940-1941: Joseph Bureau
 1912-1925: Louis Moreau
 1900-1912: Sébastien Guérin

Education
Primary schools in the commune include:
Preschools (écoles maternelles):
 Bourg: Maternelle Chateaubriand, Ecole Jean Zay, École de la Croix-Jeannette
 Couëts: Maternelle Françoise Dolto, Maternelle Célestin Freinet, Maternelle Fougan de Mer
Elementary schools:
 Bourg: Élémentaire Chateaubriand, Ecole Jean Zay, École de la Croix-Jeannette
 Couëts: Élémentaire Urbain le Verrier, Élémentaire Fougan de Mer
There is a private school group, Groupe scolaire Notre-Dame - Saint-Pierre, with École Notre-Dame and École Saint-Pierre.

There is one public junior high school, Collège et SEGPA de la Neustrie, one public high school, Lycée Professionnel Pablo Neruda, and a private alternative school, Lycée Professionnel Hôtelier Privé Daniel Brottier (the private high school is for children with academic, social, and family troubles).

See also

Communes of the Loire-Atlantique department

References

External links
 Home page  (Archive)
 Webpage about Bouguenais

Nantes
Communes of Loire-Atlantique